Rainbow Six is a techno-thriller novel, written by Tom Clancy and released on August 3, 1998. It is the second book to primarily focus on John Clark, one of the recurring characters in the Ryanverse, after Without Remorse (1993); it also features his son-in-law, Domingo "Ding" Chavez. Rainbow Six follows "Rainbow", a secret international counterterrorist organization headed by Clark (whose codename is "Rainbow Six"), and the complex apocalyptic conspiracy they unravel after handling multiple seemingly random terrorist attacks. The book debuted at number one on The New York Times Best Seller list, and has since been adapted into a successful series of video games.

Plot
CIA operative John Clark forms a top-secret international counterterrorist organization known as Rainbow. Formed to combat the proliferation of formerly state-sponsored terrorist groups left rogue after the Cold War, and based in Hereford, England, Rainbow consists of two operational teams of elite special forces soldiers from NATO countries, supplemented by intelligence and technology experts from the FBI, MI6, and Mossad. Clark serves as the commanding officer, his son-in-law Domingo Chavez leads Team-2, and SAS officer Alistair Stanley serves as their second-in-command.

In their first deployment, Team-2 rescues hostages during a bank robbery in Bern, Switzerland. Several weeks later, they are deployed to Austria, where a group of German left-wing terrorists have taken over the schloss of a wealthy Austrian businessman to obtain (nonexistent) "special access codes" to the international trading markets. They are later deployed to the Worldpark amusement park in Spain, where a group of Basque revolutionaries have taken a group of children hostage and demand that various prisoners, including Carlos the Jackal, be released.
 
Clark and his colleagues become suspicious about the sudden rise in terrorist attacks. Unbeknownst to them, the first two attacks are part of an intricate plan to wipe out nearly all of humanity, codenamed "the Project". Dr. John Brightling, a staunch radical environmentalist who heads a biotechnology firm called the Horizon Corporation, ordered the attacks through ex-KGB officer Dmitriy Popov to raise concerns of terrorism, allowing co-conspirator Bill Henriksen's security firm Global Security to land a key contract for the Olympic Games in Sydney, Australia. Henriksen would then ensure the release of "Shiva"—a manmade Ebola biological agent more deadly than the one that spread a year prior, developed by Horizon and tested on kidnapped human test subjects—through the fog-cooling system of Stadium Australia, infecting almost everyone present, who would then return to their home countries, spreading Shiva across the world. The resulting pandemic would kill millions, during which Horizon would distribute a "vaccine"—actually a slow-acting version of Shiva, ensuring the deaths of the rest of the world's population. The "chosen few", having been provided with the real vaccine, would then inherit the emptied world, justifying their genocidal actions as "saving the world" from the environmentally-destructive nature of humanity.

Popov discovers the existence of Rainbow as he reviews the "police tactical teams" (actually Rainbow in disguise) that responded to his attacks, and brings it to Brightling's attention. Brightling and Henriksen order Popov to orchestrate an attack on Rainbow to prevent them from being deployed to the Sydney Olympics. He persuades breakaway Provisional Irish Republican Army militants to attack a hospital near Rainbow's base and capture Clark and Chavez's wives, who work there as a nurse and a doctor respectively. When Rainbow arrives, a team of IRA militants ambush them, killing two Team-1 troopers and injuring several others, including Stanley. Despite sustaining their first-ever losses, Rainbow manages to repel the ambush, retake the hospital without further casualties, and capture some of the terrorists. Using trickery to interrogate the captured militants, Clark and Chavez learn of Popov's involvement, while Brightling evacuates Popov to Horizon's OLYMPUS facility in Kansas.

However, this turns out to have been a fatal miscalculation: Popov was unaware of the genocidal plans of his employers, but the people at OLYMPUS talk openly about them. Learning the truth about the Project, Popov, appalled by what he had unknowingly assisted, escapes and reveals his knowledge to Clark and the FBI, who were already investigating the kidnappings of the Shiva test subjects. Popov's warning comes just in time for Chavez and Team-2, who were deployed to the Olympics to provide security, to thwart Shiva's release at the last minute. 
 
Their plans in shambles, Brightling and the remaining Project members flee to a smaller Horizon base in the Amazon rainforest near Manaus, Brazil. Clark personally leads Rainbow to the base, where they kill the guards and demolish the buildings. Knowing there is insufficient evidence to convict them and that they would just restart their plans if freed, Clark instead has the survivors stripped naked and left to fend for themselves in the jungle, taunting them to "reconnect with nature".

Six months later, Chavez reads news articles about Popov discovering a gold deposit on a Project member's former property and Horizon's revolutionary medical breakthroughs under new management. Chavez asks if the Project members have survived; Clark informs him that no human activity has been detected in the area since, and remarks that nature does not distinguish between friends and enemies. Wondering who humanity's natural enemy must be, Chavez decides it must be humanity itself.

Characters

Team Rainbow

Executive and support branches
 John Clark: Commander of Rainbow (codename Rainbow Six)
 Alistair Stanley: Deputy Commander (codename Rainbow Five)
 Bill Tawney: Head of the intelligence section, former MI6 intelligence analyst
 Dr. Paul Bellow: Resident psychologist specializing in criminal psychology, FBI agent
 Tim Noonan: Resident tactical electronics and surveillance specialist, FBI special agent
 David Beled: Technical staff lead, Mossad agent
 Sam Bennett: Communications officer, U.S. Air Force major
 Daniel "Bear" Malloy: Pilot of Rainbow's MH-60K Night Hawk helicopter, U.S. Marine Corps lieutenant colonel
 Harrison: Malloy's co-pilot, U.S. Marine Corps first lieutenant, former 1st Special Operations Wing pilot
 Jack Nance: Mallow and Harrison's helicopter crew chief, Royal Air Force sergeant
 Dave Woods: Firing range instructor, British colour sergeant
 Alice Foorgate and Helen Montgomery: Executive secretaries
 Katherine Moony: Secretary

Team-1
 Major Peter Covington: Team-1 commander, SAS member
 Miguel "Mike" Chin: Former U.S. Navy SEAL, Master Chief Machinist's Mate
 Mortimer "Sam" Houston: Sniper-observer
 Fred "Freddy" Franklin: Rifle 1-2, former U.S. Army Marksmanship Unit instructor at Fort Benning
 Geoff Bates: Former British SAS member

Team-2
 Domingo "Ding" Chavez: Team-2 commander, former CIA Special Activities Division member, Clark's son-in-law
 Julio "Oso" Vega: Machine gunner, former Delta Force member
 Eddie Price: Senior member, former SAS sergeant major
 Louis Loiselle: Former DGSE member
 Dieter Weber: Rifle 2-2, former GSG 9 Feldwebel
 Homer Johnston: Sniper, former Delta Force member
 George Tomlinson: Former Delta Force member
 Mike Pierce: Former 82nd Airborne Division member
 Steve Lincoln: Former Delta Force member

Horizon Corporation and the Project
 John Brightling: Billionaire, chairman of Horizon Corporation, mastermind of the Project
 Bill Henriksen: Security consultant, head of Global Security, former FBI agent and Hostage Rescue Team member
 Carol Brightling: Science Advisor to the President, "former" wife of John Brightling (their divorce is a ruse used to safeguard her position, which enables her to pass secrets to Horizon)
 John Killgore: Senior research scientist involved in testing the Shiva virus
 Barbara Archer: Researcher involved in testing the Shiva virus
 Kirk Maclean: Researcher tasked with kidnapping homeless men and single women in New York City to be used as Shiva test subjects
 Mark Waterhouse: Recruiter for Brightling's "chosen few" (radical environmentalists who share the Project's ideals)
 Foster Hunnicutt: Survivalist, member of Brightling's "chosen few"
 Wilson Gearing: Former U.S. Army Chemical Corps lieutenant colonel, tasked with releasing Shiva at the Olympics

Other characters
 Dmitriy Arkadyevich Popov: Former KGB operations officer working for Brightling; also uses the aliases "Iosef Serov" and "Joseph Andrews"
 Sandra "Sandy" Clark: John Clark's wife, nurse
 Patricia "Patsy" Clark-Chavez: John Clark's daughter and Domingo Chavez's wife, MD
 Ernst Model: Sociopathic former Red Army Faction member who leads the botched bank robbery in Bern
 Hans Fürchtner: Left-wing terrorist, recruited by Popov to take over the schloss of a wealthy Austrian businessman
 Petra Dortmund: Left-wing terrorist, Fürchtner's longtime partner
 Erwin Ostermann: Austrian financier taken hostage by Fürchtner and Dortmund at his schloss
 Andre Herr: Former Action Directe member leading the terrorists during the hostage situation at Worldpark
 Sean Grady: Provisional IRA cell commander who leads the attack on the Hereford hospital
 Tom Sullivan: FBI agent based in New York investigating Bannister's disappearance
 Frank Chatham: FBI agent, Sullivan's partner
 Ed Foley: Director of Central Intelligence
 Mary Bannister: Shiva test subject who manages to message her father, alerting the FBI

Themes
Rainbow Six explores the issue of radical environmentalism. According to Marc Cerasini's essay on the novel, the philosophy of the antagonists are considered as an extreme form of naturalism, based on Jean-Jacques Rousseau's view that society's functions corrupt mankind and that "a natural or primitive state is actually morally superior to civilization". The novel shares elements found in James Bond movies: a biological weapon being used to end or rather cull the human race, mad scientists plotting world domination, and high-tech secret bases hidden from civilization. Clancy makes the plot relevant and morally ambiguous by incorporating motivations similar to those of real-life radical ecocentric environmentalists and deep ecologists, such as Pentti Linkola and Paul R. Ehrlich, rather than blanket hunger for power and brash misanthropic resentment. In several regards, critics have noted similarities in the population control regard to the later-released Kingsman: The Secret Service and Dan Brown's Inferno, as well as those of Thanos in Marvel's Avengers: Infinity War and Avengers: Endgame.

Development 
The concept of Rainbow Six was conceived from a discussion between Clancy and Doug Littlejohns, a former Royal Navy submarine commander and CEO of Red Storm Entertainment, a video game developer co-founded by Clancy in 1996. Their discussion occurred during a Red Storm company outing in Colonial Williamsburg, when Littlejohns suggested a strategy shooter game based on the FBI Hostage Rescue Team. When Clancy mentioned that he was writing a novel about a hostage rescue team, their conversation led to Littlejohns noting the protracted diplomatic delays in authorizing a foreign counterterrorist unit's deployment overseas, and he suggested the concept of a permanent counterterrorist unit that already had authorization to deploy internationally. The name "Rainbow" came from the term "Rainbow nation", a term coined by Desmond Tutu to describe post-apartheid South Africa under Nelson Mandela's presidency. "Six" came from the American rank code for captain (O-6); though Clark would more accurately be described as a major general (O-8) in the novel, "Rainbow Six" read better than "Rainbow Eight". The strategy shooter game Littlejohns suggested was eventually developed into Tom Clancy's Rainbow Six.

Reception
The book received mixed reviews. Entertainment Weekly praised the novel's "sprawling, Bondesque plot" as well as its action scenes that are "vivid and cinematic—and notably lacking in the clichés and B-movie tone of his dialogue". Publishers Weekly  also hailed the scenes as "immensely suspenseful, breathtaking combos of expertly detailed combat and primal emotion".

Criticism focused on flat characters and the implausibility of the plot. A review from Orlando Sentinel stated: "Clancy may have crossed the line into the realm of the unbelievable...I suspect even some of his most rabid fans will shake their heads at parts of this novel." Entertainment Weekly also noted that "some of [Clancy's] secondary characters have a flat, dime-novel feel". Canadian environmentalist Paul Watson condemned the book as "a vicious defamation of the Environmentalist Movement, embodying, amplifying and packaging all the worst stereotypes and prejudices."

Adaptations

Video game

Tom Clancy's Rainbow Six was released on August 21, 1998, about two weeks after the release of the novel. It was developed alongside the novel and bases its plot on an early manuscript of the story. The game was developed by Red Storm Entertainment (which was co-founded by Clancy in 1996) based on their preexisting concept of the FBI Hostage Rescue Team in an international setting. Tom Clancy's Rainbow Six was a commercial success for Red Storm and spawned a number of sequels, now developed by Ubisoft. It revolutionized the first-person shooter genre by forcing the player to think tactically and realistically in every mission, unlike the arcade-style shooters of the time.

Film
In July 2017, Paramount Pictures announced plans to make a film adaptation of the novel with Akiva Goldsman as producer. Ryan Reynolds was reported to be in early talks to play John Clark. In September 2018, Michael B. Jordan was announced to be playing John Clark in a two-part film series, with Rainbow Six as the intended sequel to Without Remorse. In January 2023, the Rainbow Six film was confirmed to be directed by Chad Stahelski, with Michael B. Jordan reprising his role as Clark.

Release details 
 1998, U.S., G. P. Putnam's Sons , Pub date August 3, 1998, hardcover
 1998, U.K., Michael Joseph Ltd , Pub date August 27, 1998, hardback
 1998, U.S., Putnam Publishing Group , Pub date August 1998, hardcover (Limited Edition)
 1998, U.S., Demco Media , Pub date September 1998, unbound
 1998, U.S., Random House , Pub date August 1998, paperback (Large Type Edition)
 1999, U.S., Berkley Publishing Group , Pub date September 1999, paperback
 1999, U.S., Berkley Publishing Group , Pub date September 1999, mass market paperback

References

External links
 
Presentation by Clancy to the National Press Club on Rainbow Six, August 6, 1998, C-SPAN

1998 American novels
American thriller novels
Biological weapons in popular culture
Eco-terrorism in fiction
G. P. Putnam's Sons books
Novels about terrorism
Novels by Tom Clancy
Ryanverse
Techno-thriller novels
Tom Clancy's Rainbow Six